Sergey Mikhaylovich Shakhray (born April 30, 1956, in Simferopol, Crimea, Soviet Union) is a Russian  politician. He is a co-author of the Constitution of the Russian Federation.

He graduated from the Rostov-on-Don State University in 1978 with a degree in law.

December 1991 – March 1992, November 1992 – January 1994, April 1994 - January 1996: Deputy Prime Minister of Russia.

External links 
 Official biography (in Russian)
 Biography (in Russian)

1956 births
Living people
1st class Active State Councillors of the Russian Federation
Party of Russian Unity and Accord politicians
20th-century Russian politicians
Deputy heads of government of the Russian Federation
Financial University under the Government of the Russian Federation alumni
First convocation members of the State Duma (Russian Federation)
Second convocation members of the State Duma (Russian Federation)